Masyas, Masyus or Masyos was a King of the Semnones in the 1st century. The Semnones were a Germanic tribe, part of the Suebi. Cassius Dio writes that he at one point visited Roman emperor Domitian along with the priestess Ganna.

Sources
 Felix Dahn: Masyos. In: Allgemeine Deutsche Biographie (ADB). Band 20, Duncker & Humblot, Leipzig 1884, S. 581.

1st-century Germanic people
Suebian kings